Cathalán ua Corcráin, Irish Abbot, died 1001.

Cathalán bore a suffix that in his or the next generation became the surname Ó Corcrán, asurname held by two at least two unrelated families. One was a Brehon family from County Fermanagh, a second were situated in Munster. Cathalán probably belonged to the Fermanagh family, as he his obit in the Annals of the Four Masters state he was abb Daimhinsi or Abbot of Devenish Island upon his death.

See also

 Brian Ó Corcrán
 Felimidh Ó Corcrán
 Fláithrí Ó Corcrán

References
 http://www.ucc.ie/celt/published/T100005D/
 http://www.irishtimes.com/ancestor/surname/index.cfm?fuseaction=Go.&UserID=

1001 deaths
10th-century Irish abbots
11th-century Irish abbots
People from County Fermanagh
Year of birth unknown